The carrick mat is a flat woven decorative knot which can be used as a mat or pad. Its name is based on the mat's decorative-type carrick bend with the ends connected together, forming an endless knot. A larger form, called the prolong knot, is made by expanding the basic carrick mat by extending, twisting, and overlapping its outer bights, then weaving the free ends through them.  This process may be repeated to produce an arbitrarily long mat.

In its basic form it is the same as a 3-lead, 4-bight Turk's head knot. The basic carrick mat, made with two passes of rope, also forms the central motif in the logo of the International Guild of Knot Tyers. 

When tied to form a cylinder around the central opening, instead of lying flat, it can be used as a woggle.

See also
 List of knots

References

External links

Alternating knots and links
Fibered knots and links
Fully amphichiral knots and links
Hyperbolic knots and links